The 16th running of the Tour of Flanders for Women, a women's cycling race in Belgium, was held on 7 April 2019. It was the sixth event of the 2019 UCI Women's World Tour. Anna van der Breggen was the defending champion. The race was won by Marta Bastianelli.

Route
The race started and finished in Oudenaarde, in the province of East Flanders. Compared to the 2017 and 2018 event, the route is extended four kilometers, totalling 157.4 km, making it the longest women's race in the history of the Tour of Flanders. It starts in the centre of Oudenaarde, before heading east towards Zottegem where two flat cobbled sectors are addressed, and returning to Oudenaarde, after which a larger loop towards Geraardsbergen begins, which features 10 hills in the Flemish Ardennes.

After the Muur van Geraardsbergen and Kanarieberg comes the Taaienberg, which features for the first time in the women's race, coming at 40 km from the finish. The final four hills – Taaienberg, Kruisberg-Hotond, Oude Kwaremont and Paterberg are identical to the men's finale. The top of the Paterberg, the last climb of the day, comes at 13.3 km from the finish, ensued by a flat run-in towards Oudenaarde.

Teams
24 teams with six riders each started, totalling 142 participants.

Results

See also
 2019 in women's road cycling

References

2019
Tour
2019 UCI Women's World Tour
April 2019 sports events in Belgium